The Great Movies is the name of several publications, both online and in print, from Roger Ebert, the American film critic and columnist for The Chicago Sun-Times. The object was, as Ebert put it, to "make a tour of the landmarks of the first century of cinema", by writing essays on films Ebert considered particularly well-made, important or influential. 

The Great Movies was published as four books:

The Great Movies, published in November 2003 (544 pages, Three Rivers Press)
The Great Movies II published in February 2006 (517 pages, Three Rivers Press)
The Great Movies III, published in October 2011 (440 pages, University of Chicago Press)
The Great Movies IV, published in September 2016 (288 pages, University of Chicago Press)

See also
1001 Movies You Must See Before You Die, a similar-themed book with essays from 70 different critics, released in 2003
List of films considered the best

References
Explanatory notes

Citations

External links
The Great Movies- official listing on Roger Ebert's website

2003 non-fiction books
American film websites
Book series introduced in 2003
Books about film
Film guides
Lists of films
Works by Roger Ebert
Roger Ebert
Three Rivers Press books